2013 Nadeshiko League Cup Final was the 8th final of the Nadeshiko League Cup competition. The final was played at Hiroshima Big Arch in Hiroshima on September 1, 2013. INAC Kobe Leonessa won the championship.

Overview
INAC Kobe Leonessa won their 1st title, by defeating Okayama Yunogo Belle 3–1 with Chiaki Minamiyama, Goebel Yanez and Nahomi Kawasumi goal.

Match details

See also
2013 Nadeshiko League Cup

References

Nadeshiko League Cup
2013 in Japanese women's football